Stuttgart I is an electoral constituency (German: Wahlkreis) represented in the Bundestag. It elects one member via first-past-the-post voting. Under the current constituency numbering system, it is designated as constituency 258. It is located in central Baden-Württemberg, comprising the central and southern part of the city of Stuttgart.

Stuttgart I was created for the inaugural 1949 federal election. Since 2021, it has been represented by Cem Özdemir of the Alliance 90/The Greens.

Geography
Stuttgart I is located in central Baden-Württemberg. As of the 2021 federal election, it comprises the Stadtbezirke of Birkach, Degerloch, Hedelfingen, Möhringen, Plieningen, Sillenbuch, Stuttgart-Mitte, Stuttgart-Nord, Stuttgart-Süd, Stuttgart-West, and Vaihingen from the independent city of Stuttgart.

History
Stuttgart I was created in 1949. In the 1980 through 1998 elections, it was named Stuttgart-Süd. In the 1949 election, it was Württemberg-Baden Landesbezirk Württemberg constituency 1 in the numbering system. In the 1953 through 1961 elections, it was number 163. In the 1965 through 1976 elections, it was number 164. In the 1980 through 1998 elections, it was number 162. In the 2002 and 2005 elections, it was number 259. Since the 2009 election, it has been number 258.

Originally, the constituency comprised the Stadtteile of Stuttgart-West, Stuttgart-Mitte, Stuttgart-Süd, Weilimdorf, Feuerbach, Botnang, Vaihingen, Möhringen, Degerloch, Birkach, Hohenheim, and Plieningen from the independent city of Stuttgart. In the 1965 through 1976 elections, it comprised the Stadtteile of Bad Cannstatt, Stammheim, Zuffenhausen, Mühlhausen, Münster, Feuerbach, Weilimdorf, and Botnang. It acquired its current borders in the 1980 election.

Members
The constituency was first represented by Clara Döhring of the Social Democratic Party (SPD) from 1949 to 1953. Artur Jahn won it for the Christian Democratic Union (CDU) in 1953 and served two terms before former member Döhring regained it in 1961. She was succeeded by fellow SPD member Erwin Schoettle from 1965 to 1972, followed by Peter Conradi from 1972 to 1980. Roland Sauer of the CDU was elected in 1980 and served until 1998. Hans Jochen Henke of the CDU served one term before Ernst Ulrich von Weizsäcker of the SPD won the constituency in 2002. Johann-Henrich Krummacher regained it for the CDU in 2005 and served one term. He was succeeded by Stefan Kaufmann in 2009, who was representative until 2021. Cem Özdemir won the constituency for the Greens in 2021.

Election results

2021 election

2017 election

2013 election

2009 election

References

Federal electoral districts in Baden-Württemberg
1949 establishments in West Germany
Constituencies established in 1949
Stuttgart